Ray Arnett (September 17, 1917 – March 12, 2015) was an American producer, choreographer and stage director best known for his work with Liberace.

Arnett is also known for introducing Liberace to future partner Scott Thorson.

Arnett was portrayed by actor Tom Papa in the 2013 HBO film Behind the Candelabra.

He died on March 12, 2015, at the age of 97.

References

External links 
 USA Today

2015 deaths
American theatre managers and producers
American theatre directors
American choreographers
1917 births